The Northallerton–Eaglescliffe line runs between  and  stations. It connects the East Coast Main Line to the Tees Valley Line.

Stations

Open
The current stations on the line are:
Northallerton
Yarm
Eaglescliffe

Closed
A number of stations that used to serve towns and villages on the line were closed between 1954 and the end of local passenger services over the route on 6 September 1965, with those at Picton, Yarm and Brompton being the last to go. The station at Yarm was subsequently reopened by Regional Railways North East in February 1996.

Services
Most services are run by TransPennine Express between Manchester Airport and Middlesbrough. Services are roughly hourly and call at all stations as part of the North TransPennine route. A further five trains a day in each direction (as of December 2021) by Grand Central serve Northallerton and Eaglescliffe as part of the route between Sunderland and London King's Cross.

The lines also sees use by a variety of heavy freight services to/from Teesside, including petroleum from Port Clarence, steel trains to and from Hartlepool, Scunthorpe and Aldwarke, the Freightliner terminal at Teesport and waste traffic to Wilton EFW. 

The line is also part of a diversionary route to Newcastle using the Durham Coast Line when the East Coast Main Line route via Darlington and Durham Is closed.

Notes

External links

Rail transport in North Yorkshire
Railway lines opened in 1852
Railway lines in North East England
Railway lines in Yorkshire and the Humber
1852 establishments in England